The Saint Croix–Vanceboro Bridge is an international bridge, which connects the communities of Saint Croix, New Brunswick in Canada and Vanceboro, Maine in the United States, across the St. Croix River.

The bridge was constructed in 1927 as a concrete T-beam structure, and opened in 1928. The original bridge was replaced with the current deck in 1997.

Transport Canada estimated the bridge's traffic at 66,635 vehicles annually in 2006.

Border crossing

The Vanceboro - St. Croix Border Crossing connects the towns of Vanceboro, Maine and Saint Croix, New Brunswick on the Canada–United States border. The Canadian government has at times called this crossing McAdam, named for the larger municipality east of St. Croix. In the early 1900s, this crossing was located at the adjacent lock structure a short distance to the north. At some point in the distant past (at least prior to 1930), a bridge existed to the south of the railroad bridge, extending from Public Crossing Road on the Canadian side. Concrete footings for this bridge remain on the US side at this site.

References
 Transport Canada

Road bridges in New Brunswick
Canada–United States bridges
Bridges completed in 1928
Bridges completed in 1997
Road bridges in Maine
International bridges in Maine
Concrete bridges in the United States
Concrete bridges in Canada